The 2017 Swiss Olympic Curling Trials were held from October 11 to 14 at the Curlinghalle Biel in Biel-Bienne, Switzerland. The winning team represented Switzerland at the 2018 Winter Olympics. There was only a women's event, as the Peter de Cruz rink has already been chosen to represent Switzerland in men's curling.

The Silvana Tirinzoni rink from Aarau won the event, after posting a 6-0 round robin record, rendering a playoff unnecessary.

Round-robin standings

Scores

Draw 1
October 11, 14:00

Draw 2
October 11, 19:00

Draw 3
October 12, 09:00

Draw 4
October 12, 14:00

Draw 5
October 12, 19:00

Draw 6
October 13, 09:00

Draw 7
October 13, 14:00

Draw 8
October 13, 19:00

Draw 9
October 14, 09:00

(Not played; unnecessary)

References

External links

2017 in women's curling
Biel/Bienne
Women's curling competitions in Switzerland
2017 in Swiss women's sport
Curling at the 2018 Winter Olympics
Swiss Olympic Curling Trials
Olympic Curling Trials
Switzerland at the Winter Olympics
Qualification tournaments for the 2018 Winter Olympics